This page gathers the results of elections in Brittany.

Regional elections

Last regional election

In the last regional election, which took place on March 21 and March 28, 2004, Jean-Yves Le Drian (PS) was elected President, defeating incumbent Josselin de Rohan (UMP).